Suicide Risk was an ongoing comic book series that ran for 25 issues from 2013 until 2015. It was written by Mike Carey and drawn by Elena Casagrande.

Synopsis
Leo Winters is a police officer in San Diego when people with superpowers suddenly start appearing all over the world, leading to a wave of destruction and carnage. He manages to track down a grifter couple who are in possession of a device that helps people "unlock" their superpowers for a sizeable fee. They use the device on him, and he soon finds that he has not only developed superpowers, but a suppressed identity, the extra-dimensional warlord Requiem, has taken over his body.

Leo/Requiem will soon be forced to play a part in a huge conflict across dimensional barriers, threatening to destroy not only himself and his family, but the entire world and possibly the universe.

Release history
Issue #1-25 (March 2013 - March 2015)
Collected in Trade Paperbacks: 
Volume 1 (collects #1–4, tpb, 128 pages, 2013)
Volume 2 (collects #5-9, tpb, 128 pages, 2014)
Volume 3 (collects #10-13, tpb, 128 pages, 2014)
Volume 4 (collects #14-17, tpb, 128 pages, 2015)
Volume 5 (collects #18-21, tpb, 128 pages, 2015)
Volume 6 (collects #22-25, tpb, 160 pages, 2016)

Reception
Critical reception for the series has been positive and the series has an average Critic rating of 8.1 on Comic Book Roundup, based on 45 reviews.

References

Boom! Studios titles
2013 comics debuts